Matic Špec (born 26 February 1995) is an inactive Slovenian tennis player.

Špec has a career high ATP singles ranking of 710, achieved on 13 December 2021. He also has a career high doubles ranking of 701, achieved on 5 August 2019. He has won 1 ITF doubles title. 

Špec represents Slovenia at the Davis Cup, where he has a W/L record of 1–0.

Špec played college tennis at University of Minnesota.

References

External links

Matic Špec at the University of Minnesota

1995 births
Living people
Slovenian male tennis players
Minnesota Golden Gophers men's tennis players
Sportspeople from Maribor